The 2006 NCAA Division I men's basketball tournament involved 65 teams playing in a single-elimination tournament to determine the national champion of men's NCAA Division I college basketball as a culmination of the 2005–06 basketball season. It began on March 14, 2006, and concluded on April 3 at the RCA Dome in Indianapolis, Indiana.

None of the Tournament's top seeds advanced to the Final Four, the first time since 1980 that this occurred. For the second time in history, a team seeded 11th advanced to the Final Four as George Mason of the Colonial Athletic Association won the Washington, D.C. region. They were joined by Atlanta region winner LSU (who was the first team to advance to the Final Four as an 11-seed in 1986), Oakland region winner UCLA, who had not made the Final Four since they won the National Championship in 1995, and Minneapolis region winner Florida, who had not made the Final Four since their runner-up finish in 2000 also in Indianapolis.

Florida won its first-ever national basketball championship by defeating UCLA 73–57 in the final game. Florida's Joakim Noah was named the Most Outstanding Player of the NCAA tournament.

George Mason's run was one of several upsets by lower-seeded teams in the tournament. For the second consecutive year, a No. 14 seed beat a No. 3 seed as Northwestern State defeated Iowa. No. 13 seed Bradley also defeated No. 4 seed Kansas and advanced to the Sweet Sixteen by defeating No. 5-seeded Pittsburgh in the second round. Two No. 12 seeds won as well, as Montana and Texas A&M both won their respective First round matchups. For the second straight year, Milwaukee won as a double-digit seed, this time as the No. 11-seeded Panthers defeated Oklahoma in the first round.

Tournament procedure

A total of 65 teams were selected to participate in the tournament. Of that total, 31 of the teams earned automatic bids by winning their conference tournaments. Penn earned an automatic bid by winning the regular-season title of the Ivy League, which did not conduct a conference tournament. The remaining 34 teams were granted "at-large" bids, which are extended by the NCAA Selection Committee.

The initial game on March 14 officially named the Opening Round game, but popularly called the "play-in game", had Monmouth, winner of the Northeast Conference tournament, facing Hampton, who won the Mid-Eastern Athletic Conference tournament, for a chance to play top seed Villanova in the first round of the Tournament. Monmouth defeated Hampton, 71–49, to advance to play Villanova.

All teams were seeded from 1 to 16 within their regions. The Selection Committee seeded the entire field from 1 to 65. In a practice used since 2004, the ranking of the four top seeds against each other would determine the pairings in the Final Four. The top overall seed would be seeded to play the fourth overall seed in the national semifinals, should both teams advance that far. In 2006, these rankings were as follows: No. 1 Duke, No. 2 Connecticut, No. 3 Villanova, and No. 4 Memphis.

Schedule and venues

The following are the sites that were selected to host each round of the 2006 tournament:

Opening Round
March 14
University of Dayton Arena, Dayton, Ohio (Host: University of Dayton)

First and Second Rounds
March 16 and 18
 Cox Arena, San Diego, California (Host: San Diego State University)
 Greensboro Coliseum, Greensboro, North Carolina (Host: Atlantic Coast Conference)
 Jacksonville Veterans Memorial Arena, Jacksonville, Florida (Host: Jacksonville University)
 Jon M. Huntsman Center, Salt Lake City, Utah (Host: University of Utah)
March 17 and 19
 American Airlines Center, Dallas, Texas (Host: Big 12 Conference)
 The Palace of Auburn Hills, Auburn Hills, Michigan (Hosts: Oakland University, Mid-Continent Conference)
 University of Dayton Arena, Dayton, Ohio (Host: University of Dayton)
 Wachovia Center, Philadelphia, Pennsylvania (Host: Atlantic 10 Conference)

Regional semifinals and finals (Sweet Sixteen and Elite Eight)
March 23 and 25
Atlanta Regional, Georgia Dome, Atlanta, Georgia (Host: Georgia Institute of Technology)
Oakland Regional, Oakland Arena, Oakland, California (Hosts: University of San Francisco, West Coast Conference)
March 24 and 26
Minneapolis Regional, Hubert H. Humphrey Metrodome, Minneapolis, Minnesota (Host: University of Minnesota)
Washington, D.C. Regional, Verizon Center, Washington, D.C. (Host: Georgetown University)

National semifinals and championship (Final Four and championship)
April 1 and 3
RCA Dome, Indianapolis, Indiana (Hosts: Butler University, Horizon League)

Qualifying teams

Automatic bids
The following teams were automatic qualifiers for the 2006 NCAA field by virtue of winning their conference's tournament (except for the Ivy League, whose regular-season champion received the automatic bid).

Listed by region and seeding

Bids by conference

Bracket
(*) – Number of asterisks denotes number of overtimes.

Opening Round game – Dayton, Ohio
Winner advances to Minneapolis Regional vs. No. 1 Villanova.

Atlanta Regional

Oakland Regional

Minneapolis Regional

Washington, D.C. Regional

Final Four – Indianapolis, Indiana

Record by conference

*Monmouth University won the Opening Round game.

The America East, Atlantic Sun, Big South, Big West, Ivy, MAAC, MAC, MEAC, Ohio Valley, SoCon, SWAC, Mid-Continent, and Sun Belt conferences all went 0–1.

The columns R32, S16, E8, F4, and CG respectively stand for the Round of 32, Sweet Sixteen, Elite Eight, Final Four, and championship Game.

Announcers
Jim Nantz and Billy Packer – First & Second Round at Philadelphia, Pennsylvania; Minneapolis Regional at the Hubert H. Humphrey Metrodome; Final Four at Indianapolis, Indiana
Dick Enberg and Jay Bilas – First & Second Round at San Diego, California; Atlanta Regional at the Georgia Dome
Verne Lundquist and Bill Raftery – First & Second Round at Auburn Hills, Michigan; Washington, D.C. Regional at the Verizon Center
Gus Johnson and Len Elmore – First & Second Round at Dayton, Ohio; Oakland Regional at the Oakland Arena
Kevin Harlan and Dan Bonner – First & Second Round at Greensboro, North Carolina
Ian Eagle and Jim Spanarkel – First & Second Round at Salt Lake City, Utah
Craig Bolerjack and Bob Wenzel – First & Second Round at Dallas, Texas
Tim Brando, Stephen Bardo, and Mike Gminski – First & Second Round at Jacksonville, Florida

Greg Gumbel once again served as the studio host, joined by analysts Clark Kellogg and Seth Davis.

See also
 2006 NCAA Division II men's basketball tournament
 2006 NCAA Division III men's basketball tournament
 2006 NCAA Division I women's basketball tournament
 2006 NCAA Division II women's basketball tournament
 2006 NCAA Division III women's basketball tournament
 2006 National Invitation Tournament
 2006 Women's National Invitation Tournament
 2006 NAIA Division I men's basketball tournament
 2006 NAIA Division II men's basketball tournament
 2006 NAIA Division I women's basketball tournament
 2006 NAIA Division II women's basketball tournament

Notes
The futures of two of this year's Final Four teams would be polar opposites of the other two in 2007. Both George Mason and LSU would fail to receive a bid to either the NCAA tournament or the NIT, while both Florida and UCLA would return to the Final Four (the two teams would have a rematch, this time in the semifinals, with the same result, a Florida victory).
 George Mason became the first team from a "mid-major" conference to reach the Final Four since UNLV's loss to Duke in 1991.
 This was the second of three Final Fours to feature no No. 1 seeds (1980 and 2011 being the others).
 Duke was the last team before Florida to win back-to-back titles, and like Florida, they won their first of the two in Indianapolis at the RCA Dome.

References

NCAA Division I men's basketball tournament
Ncaa
NCAA Division I men's basketball tournament
NCAA Division I men's basketball tournament
NCAA Division I men's basketball tournament
NCAA
NCAA